Avinsino Corner is an unincorporated community in El Dorado County, California.

References

Unincorporated communities in California
Unincorporated communities in El Dorado County, California